Pakuranga Heights is an Auckland suburb.

Demographics

Pakuranga Heights had a population of 9,240 at the 2018 New Zealand census, an increase of 441 people (5.0%) since the 2013 census, and an increase of 663 people (7.7%) since the 2006 census. There were 2,811 households, comprising 4,710 males and 4,524 females, giving a sex ratio of 1.04 males per female, with 2,034 people (22.0%) aged under 15 years, 1,917 (20.7%) aged 15 to 29, 4,314 (46.7%) aged 30 to 64, and 981 (10.6%) aged 65 or older.

Ethnicities were 47.0% European/Pākehā, 11.3% Māori, 10.4% Pacific peoples, 40.7% Asian, and 3.5% other ethnicities. People may identify with more than one ethnicity.

The percentage of people born overseas was 46.6, compared with 27.1% nationally.

Although some people chose not to answer the census's question about religious affiliation, 44.4% had no religion, 36.2% were Christian, 0.6% had Māori religious beliefs, 4.7% were Hindu, 3.2% were Muslim, 2.5% were Buddhist and 2.2% had other religions.

Of those at least 15 years old, 1,851 (25.7%) people had a bachelor's or higher degree, and 990 (13.7%) people had no formal qualifications. 1,128 people (15.7%) earned over $70,000 compared to 17.2% nationally. The employment status of those at least 15 was that 3,870 (53.7%) people were employed full-time, 924 (12.8%) were part-time, and 282 (3.9%) were unemployed.

Education
Rolls are as of

References

Suburbs of Auckland
Howick Local Board Area